Holger Louis Nielsen (18 December 1866 in Copenhagen – 26 January 1955 in Hellerup) was a Danish fencer, sport shooter, and athlete. He competed at the 1896 Summer Olympics in Athens. He is probably best known for drawing up the first modern set of rules for the game of handball.

Fencing
Nielsen's main sport was fencing, in which he competed in the sabre. At Athens, Nielsen placed third in the sabre event.  He split his matches in the five-man, round-robin tournament. Nielsen defeated Adolf Schmal and Georgios Iatridis, but lost to Telemachos Karakalos and Ioannis Georgiadis. This 2-2 record put Nielsen in third place.

Firearms competitions
In the military rifle event, Nielsen quit the competition after the first day. He had shot 20 times out of the full 40, though his score was unknown. Nielsen placed fifth in the military pistol event. He won a bronze medal in the rapid fire pistol, coming in last of the three shooters that finished the competition. His best result of the Games was a surprise silver medal in the free pistol competition; his score of 285 was far behind Sumner Paine's 442 but was sufficient to defeat the other three shooters in the event. His scores for each of the five strings of 6 shots were 12, 85, 62, 24, and 100.

Discus
Nielsen also competed in the discus throw. He did not place among the top four in the event, though records are unclear as to which place between fifth and last (ninth) he received.

Other activities

Nielsen is also credited with developing an early set of rules for handball in 1898, and with developing a form of external cardiopulmonary resuscitation called the Holger Nielsen method in 1932. The National Research Council gave support to this method in 1951, however, it was superseded by mouth to mouth resuscitation in recommendations of 1958. (Artificial Respiration, the history of an idea. A B Baker Med Hist. 1971 15(4): 336-351)

References

External links

Olympic athletes of Denmark
Olympic fencers of Denmark
Olympic shooters of Denmark
Athletes (track and field) at the 1896 Summer Olympics
19th-century sportsmen
Fencers at the 1896 Summer Olympics
Shooters at the 1896 Summer Olympics
Danish male discus throwers
Danish male sabre fencers
Danish male sport shooters
ISSF rifle shooters
ISSF pistol shooters
1866 births
1955 deaths
Olympic silver medalists for Denmark
Olympic bronze medalists for Denmark
Olympic medalists in fencing
Olympic medalists in shooting
Medalists at the 1896 Summer Olympics
Creators of sports
History of handball
Cardiopulmonary resuscitation
Sportspeople from Copenhagen